Milo: Sticky Notes and Brain Freeze is a children's novel written by Alan Silberberg, released on July 26, 2011. It won the 2011 QWF Literary Award for Children's and Young Adult Literature and the 2011 Sid Fleischman Humor Award, which is overseen by the Society of Children's Book Writers and Illustrators.

Plot
Milo Cruikshank, a 13-year-old boy who struggles since his mother died, moves in a new home and meets many new people. He also falls in love with a girl named Summer Goodman and befriends Marshall Hickler, Hillary  Alpert, and Sylvia Poole.

Characters
Milo Cruikshank, The main character.
Hillary Alpert, One of Milo's friends.
Marshall Hickler "The One-Eyed Jack" , Another one of Milo's friends.
Summer Goodman, The girl that Milo has a crush on. 
Milo's Dad, Milo's father, he suffers from depression since his wife died.
Milo's Sister, The sibling of Milo.
Milo's Mom, Milo's late mother who died of a [brain tumor].
Dabney St. Claire, a character Milo created that guides him. 
Sylvia Poole, an old woman.
Paul Poole Sylvia's husband that died. ( The book does not state why, exactly )

References

External links
Books.simonandschuster.com

American children's novels
2011 American novels
2011 children's books
Aladdin Paperbacks books